WWE Hall of Fame (2012) was the event which featured the introduction of the 13th class to the WWE Hall of Fame. The event was produced by WWE on March 31, 2012 from the American Airlines Arena in Miami, Florida. The event took place the same weekend as WrestleMania XXVIII. The event was hosted by Jerry Lawler. A condensed one-hour version of the ceremony aired on the USA Network the following Monday, before Raw. In March 2015 the ceremony was added to the WWE Network.

Event
Mil Máscaras was inducted by Alberto Del Rio.

Ron Simmons was inducted by his former tag team partner as part of The Acolytes Protection Agency, John Layfield. The two shared stories of being on the road together, and Simmons discussed what it was like to be the first black World Heavyweight Champion.

Yokozuna was inducted by his nephews, The Usos, Jimmy Uso and Jey Uso. The Usos discussed their "Uncle Rodney" and their confusion as kids as to why he was dressed as a sumo wrestler and was throwing salt. Due to Yokozuna's death in 2000 he was posthumously inducted by his cousin Rikishi and his family.

The Four Horsemen were next inducted by Dusty Rhodes. Although through the years there were more members, the only ones inducted into the WWE Hall of Fame were "Nature Boy" Ric Flair, Barry Windham, "The Enforcer" Arn Anderson, Tully Blanchard and J. J. Dillon. With this induction Ric Flair became the first person to be inducted twice (an accolade he alone held until 2019 when Shawn Michaels, Bret Hart, and Booker T were all inducted again).  Flair was under contract with rival promotion TNA at the time, but they and WWE made a deal so Flair could attend the event in person; the deal saw Christian go the other way for one night later in the year.

Mike Tyson was inducted by D-Generation X members Shawn Michaels and Triple H.

The final inductee was Edge who was inducted by his childhood friend Christian. The two shared stories of coming up through the Canadian wrestling system and their time together in the WWE.

Inductees

Individual
 Class headliners appear in boldface

Group

Celebrity

References

WWE Hall of Fame ceremonies
2012 in professional wrestling
Professional wrestling in Miami
2012 in professional wrestling in Florida
Events in Miami
March 2012 events in the United States